Siluwa  is a village development committee in Palpa District in the Lumbini Zone of southern Nepal. At the time of the 1991 Nepal census, it had a population of 4616 people living in 827 individual households. Villages within it include Romandi. Maslang is one of the main village ward no 1 which is mostly occupied by Ale magar Thar people you can find the Rana magar and masrangi magar aswel, one of the old school shree janamarga higher secondary school also in Maslang  
 and in siluwa , it coveres Darsing bhanjyang, Hatiya , and siluwa , all cast Bhahun, Magar , Newar, Darji , and Biswakarma  people leaving in siluwa ,  Mandali baraju world famous temple also there in Siluwa ..

References

Populated places in Palpa District